Alvin Duane Schneider (born February 3, 1943) is an American magician, author, physicist and mathematician known for his contributions to magic. He developed the Matrix magic trick, a modern version of Yank Hoe's "Sympathetic Coins".

Biography
Schneider was born and raised in Detroit, Michigan. He lived in Minneapolis, Minnesota for most of his life and spent a year in Denver, Colorado. He started in magic in 1960, his senior year in high school. In 1967, Schneider graduated from Wayne State University with a degree in physics, after seven years in school part time. During his free time he studied magic working toward his goal of a career in professional magic.

In 1960, Schneider developed the Matrix magic trick, a trick where four cards are placed over four coins. The coins then invisibly move between cards. Matrix is a modernized version of Yank Hoe's "Sympathetic Coins".

In 1969, Schneider left his job as a mathematician for Uniroyal and accepted a position as a systems analyst for Univac, specializing in computers. Univac transferred him to Minneapolis, Minnesota, where he was employed as a systems programmer.

In 1972, he began writing and publishing magic books after the computer industry suffered a downturn.  He worked as an editor of house organ Goldshadow Newsletter and also as a dealer for Goldshadow Industries. Schneider theorized that "misdirection, while essential for effective magic, is actually a supporting technique to greater concept of hiding the spectators' false assumptions".

Since early 2001, he has operated a web page sharing magic information titled World Magic Center

Schneider was also interested in full contact Karate, sword fighting, golf, skiing, theoretical physics and quantum mechanics. Schneider gave magic lessons to a magician duo who tricked Penn and Teller on Penn & Teller: Fool Us with a magic routine called "A Mother's Love".

Books
Matrix (1974)
Off (1974) 
Al Schneider on Coins (1975)
Al Schneider on Close-Up (1980)
Al Schneider on Zombie (1981)
Al Schneider Magic (2011)
New Age Quantum Physics (2012)
Quantum Mechanics A-Z without the BS (2013)

References

Further reading

1943 births
American magicians
Living people